Poocham is an unincorporated community in the town of Westmoreland in Cheshire County, New Hampshire, United States, near the larger communities of Keene, New Hampshire and Brattleboro, Vermont.

Poocham's oldest houses date from around 1800. By reputation, the name Poocham comes from an Abenaki Indian word meaning "gathering place". The community is almost entirely composed of homes and farms, but a small fluorite mine (called William Wise Mine) and growing vineyard (called Poocham Hill Winery) are also present.

References

External links
 Poocham Hill Winery

Unincorporated communities in Cheshire County, New Hampshire
Unincorporated communities in New Hampshire
New Hampshire placenames of Native American origin